Božo Jević (born 12 September 1986) is a Serbian professional footballer who plays as a defender for Novi Sad 1921.

References

External links
 
 
 
 Bozo Jević at Everythingforfootball.com

1986 births
Living people
Footballers from Novi Sad
Association football defenders
Serbian footballers
FK Mačva Šabac players
FK ČSK Čelarevo players
OFK Bačka players
FK Cement Beočin players
SW Bregenz players
Serbian SuperLiga players
Serbian expatriate footballers
Expatriate footballers in Austria
Serbian expatriate sportspeople in Austria
Expatriate footballers in Switzerland
Serbian expatriate sportspeople in Switzerland